William Sheppard was an American Negro league pitcher in the 1920s.

Sheppard played for the Memphis Red Sox in 1924. In six recorded appearances on the mound, he posted a 2.90 ERA over 31 innings.

References

External links
 and Seamheads

Year of birth missing
Year of death missing
Place of birth missing
Place of death missing
Memphis Red Sox players
Baseball pitchers